Thomas Henry Payne (14 May 1862 – 29 November 1932) was an Australian politician.

He was born in South Yarra to pioneer builder Thomas Budds Payne and Rosalie Mary Hemphill. He attended Geelong Grammar School and inherited his father's considerable wealth. Around 1894 he married Georgiana Dale Crooke, with whom he had two daughters. He owned land at Kilmore, where he bred cattle and sheep, but was based in Toorak. In 1901 he was elected to the Victorian Legislative Council for South Yarra Province, moving to Melbourne South Province in 1904. A Liberal and then a Nationalist, he was a minister without portfolio from 1908 to 1909. Payne retired in 1928 and died in Toorak in 1932.

References

1862 births
1932 deaths
Nationalist Party of Australia members of the Parliament of Victoria
Members of the Victorian Legislative Council
People educated at Geelong Grammar School
Australian people of Irish descent